James Henry Davidson (June 18, 1858 – August 6, 1918) was a U.S. Representative from Wisconsin.

Born in Colchester, New York, Davidson attended the public schools and Walton (New York) Academy. He taught school in Delaware and Sullivan Counties, New York. He graduated from the Albany Law School in 1884 and was admitted to the bar the same year. He moved to Green Lake County, Wisconsin, and commenced practice in Princeton, Wisconsin in 1887.

Davidson was elected district attorney of Green Lake County in 1888. He served as chairman of the Republican congressional committee for the sixth district of Wisconsin in 1890. He moved to Oshkosh, Wisconsin on January 1, 1892, and continued the practice of law. He was appointed city attorney in May 1895 for two years.

Davidson was elected representative of Wisconsin's 6th congressional district as a Republican to the Fifty-fifth and to the two succeeding Congresses (March 4, 1897 – March 3, 1903). He served as chairman of the Committee on Railways and Canals (Fifty-sixth through Sixty-first Congresses). From the Fifty-eighth Congress Davidson redistricted and was elected as the representative of Wisconsin's 8th congressional district and was reelected to the four succeeding congresses in the same role (March 4, 1903 – March 4, 1913) He was an unsuccessful candidate for reelection in 1912 to the Sixty-third Congress and for election in 1914 to the Sixty-fourth Congress. For the Sixty-fifth Congress Davidson was once again elected as the representative of Wisconsin's 6th district serving from March 4, 1917, until his death in Washington, D.C. on August 6, 1918. He died of heart disease and was interred in Riverside Cemetery in Oshkosh, Wisconsin.  On April 5, 1917, he was one of the 50 representatives who voted against declaring war on Germany.

See also
List of United States Congress members who died in office (1900–49)

Sources

Obituary - New York Times
James H. Davidson, late a representative from Wisconsin, Memorial addresses delivered in the House of Representatives and Senate frontispiece 1917

1858 births
1918 deaths
Albany Law School alumni
Politicians from Oshkosh, Wisconsin
People from Princeton, Wisconsin
Republican Party members of the United States House of Representatives from Wisconsin
19th-century American politicians